2K21 may refer to:

 the year 2021
 NBA 2K21, 2020 video game
 PGA Tour 2K21, 2020 video game